Ukraine competed at the 2013 Summer Universiade in Kazan, Russia, from 6 July to 17 July 2013. 361 athletes formed the Ukrainian team that was second largest (after the Russian).

Ukraine won 76 medals (4th by number after Russia, Japan, and China), including 12 gold medals (6th place).

Svitlana Shmidt who originally won silver in women's 3000 metres steeplechase was stripped of her medal due to doping offences.

Competitors 
Ukraine was represented by 361 athletes in 22 sports. Ukraine was not represented in beach volleyball, diving, synchronised swimming, and water polo.

Medal summary

Medal by sports

Medalists

See also
 Ukraine at the 2013 Winter Universiade

References

Nations at the 2013 Summer Universiade
2013 in Ukrainian sport
2013